Huaura is one of nine provinces of the Department of Lima on the Pacific coast of Peru. It has a population of about 180,000 inhabitants. Is the most important province of the Region Lima-Provinces. It is bordered by the province of Barranca and the Ancash Region in the north, the provinces of Cajatambo and Oyón and the Pasco Region in the east, the province of Huaral in the south and the Pacific Ocean in the west.  Huacho is the capital of the province as well as the Region Lima.

Geography 
Some of the highest mountains of the province are listed below:

Political division
The  is divided into twelve districts:
Huacho (seat)
Ambar
Caleta
Checras
Hualmay
Huaura
Leoncio Prado
Paccho
Santa Leonor
Santa María
Sayán
Vegueta

Villages 
 

Acain

See also 
 Q'asaqucha
Region Lima - Provinces
Huacho
Norte Chico

References 

Provinces of the Lima Region